The following is a list of secretaries of state of Texas for both the Republic of Texas and the State of Texas.

Secretaries of state of the Republic of Texas (1836–1846)

Secretaries of state of the State of Texas (1846–present)

References

Lists of Texas politicians